The Ferrocarril de Junin was a  narrow gauge railway operating in northern Chile, and was built to serve the nitrate workings. The terminal of the railway was located at the port of Junin, and the railway was opened in 1894. The first section of the railway consisted of a 1 km incline plane, rising from the port to 674 metres above sea-level, that is a 67.4% grade. From the top of the incline there was a 51 km main line to Oficina Reducto. Branching off the main line was a 17 km branch to Aragon, and 8 other branches totalling 39 km.

The locomotive stock consisted of five 0-6-2 tank locomotives by Avonside, as well as two 0-6+6-0 Fairlie locomotives manufactured by the Yorkshire Engine Company and at least one small electric locomotive made by the Baldwin Locomotive Works. The railway operated in one of the driest areas on earth, and cartage of water for the steam locomotive boilers was a major expense. In 1930 the railway purchased a 2-6-2 diesel locomotive constructed by Hudswell Clarke . This locomotive, named Junin, is believed to be the first to have used the road switcher layout.  Although a success the locomotive failed to avert the closure of the railway in 1931.
Although  Junin survived it is in a very bad state, it now lives in the Armley Mills Museum in Leeds.

References

External links
 Ian Thomson, La Nitrate Railways Co. Ltd.: La Pérdida de sus derechos exclusivos en el mercado del transporte del salitre y su respuesta a ella, Instituto de Historia, Pontificia Universidad Católica de Chile, Historia No 38, Vol. I, enero-junio 2005: 85-112, ISSN 0073-2435

2 ft 6 in gauge railways in Chile
Railway lines in Chile
Saltpeter works in Chile